The Hub (also referred to as Hub Minneapolis and Hub on Campus) is a luxury residential apartment building located in Minneapolis, Minnesota. The project was first announced under the working name 311 Harvard, before being renamed as the Hub during construction. The building was designed by Hartshorne Plunkard Architecture and includes 407 residential units designated for the campus population of the nearby University of Minnesota. It also contains leasable retail space, with current tenants including Caribou Coffee, Chase Bank, Wells Fargo, and Roti Modern Mediterranean.

Construction and opening 
Construction began on the Hub in October 2016 with a traditional groundbreaking ceremony. In the official proposal for the Hub, the completed project would become one of the tallest structures located near the University of Minnesota campus.

Design 
The exterior contains a 268 ft (82 m) glass curtain wall, inspired by neighboring urban walls within the vicinity. Holly Dolezalek from Minneapolis financial magazine Finance & Commerce named it one of the "Top Projects of 2018", highlighting its efforts to continue construction despite numerous setbacks.

Location 
The Hub is located at the intersection of Harvard Street Southeast and Washington Avenue Southeast, adjacent to the Metro Green Line East Bank light rail station. It was built atop a former retail block in the East Bank neighborhood of Minneapolis, with previous businesses such as Big 10 Restaurant and Espresso Exposé becoming displaced after the project's announcement.

References

External links 
 Official website

2018 establishments in Minnesota
Apartment buildings in Minnesota
Buildings and structures in Minneapolis
Residential buildings completed in 2018
Residential skyscrapers in Minneapolis